Johannes Cocceius (also Coccejus; ; 9 August 1603 – 5 November 1669) was a Dutch theologian born in Bremen.

Life

After studying at Hamburg and the University of Franeker, where Sixtinus Amama was one of his teachers, he became in 1630 professor of biblical philology at the Gymnasium illustre in his native town. In 1636 he was transferred to Franeker, where he held the chair of Hebrew, and from 1643 the chair of theology also, until 1650, when he succeeded the elder Friedrich Spanheim as professor of theology at the University of Leiden.

His chief services as an oriental scholar were in the department of Hebrew philology and exegesis. As one of the leading exponents of the covenant or federal theology, he spiritualized the Hebrew scriptures to such an extent that it was said that Cocceius found Christ everywhere in the Old Testament and Hugo Grotius found him nowhere.

He taught that before as much as after the fall of man, the relation between God and man was a covenant. The first covenant was a Covenant of Works. For this was substituted, after the Fall, the Covenant of Grace, necessitating the coming of Jesus for its fulfillment. He held millenarian views, and was the founder of a school of theologians who were called Cocceians. His most distinguished pupil was Campeius Vitringa.

Works

His major work was his Lexicon et commentarius sermonis hebraici et chaldaici (Leiden, 1669), which has been frequently republished.  His theology is fully expounded in his Summa Doctrinae de Foedere et Testamento Dei (1648), where he worked out what would eventually be considered a biblical-theological, redemptive-historical perspective for presenting covenant theology.  This Cocceian procedure, known today as "biblical theology", was set against the analytical doctrine-by-doctrine approach of his contemporaries in Holland—most famously, Voetius.  For more than half a century, the biblical theology of Cocceius and the systematic theology of Voetius stirred controversy in the church of Holland, each side trying to prove the errors and illegitimacy of the other.  As an exponent of federal theology he was tacitly influenced by his teachers in Bremen, Matthias Martinius and Ludwig Crocius.

His collected works were published in 12 folio volumes (Amsterdam, 1673-75).

See also
 Sybilline oracles

References

Sources

Further reading
 Heiner Faulenbach: Coccejus, Johannes. In: Theologische Realenzyklopädie 8 (1981), pp. 132–140.
 Reinhard Breymayer: Auktionskataloge deutscher Pietistenbibliotheken. Die beiden neuentdeckten Auktionskataloge für die Privatbibliothek des Vorpietisten Johannes Coccejus, des bedeutendsten reformierten Theologen des 17. Jahrhunderts. [...] In: Bücherkataloge als buchgeschichtliche Quellen in der frühen Neuzeit. Ed. by Reinhard Wittmann. Harrassowitz, Wiesbaden 1985 (Wolfenbütteler Schriften zur Geschichte des Buchwesens, vol. 10), pp. 113–208.

External links
 The Correspondence of Johannes Coccejus in EMLO
 

1603 births
1669 deaths
Dutch Calvinist and Reformed theologians
Christian Hebraists
Writers from Bremen
University of Franeker alumni
Academic staff of the University of Franeker
Academic staff of Leiden University
Burials at Pieterskerk, Leiden
17th-century Calvinist and Reformed theologians